Hjorthagen is a district in the northeastern part of central Stockholm, located near Ropsten and Lidingöbron. Since 1997, Hjorthagen has been part of Östermalm district.

District

Hjorthagen belongs to Östermalm district, it had around 8,000 inhabitants in 2017. The district borders Ladugårdsgärdet and Norra Djurgården. Due to new investment on infrastructures, the district of Hjorthagen is estimated to have over 17,000 inhabitants by year 2027.

References

Districts of Stockholm